South Australia (previously known as the South Australian Bite) compete in the Claxton Shield Baseball Championship in Australia. They were one of the founding teams of the Claxton Shield in 1934 and competed until 1988 where the Claxtion Shield was thereafter awarded to the winner of the Australian Baseball League until 1999 when they were invited to join the International Baseball League of Australia which they competed in for 2 seasons(1999-00 and 2002), after this point the Claxton Shield reverted to a competition similar to 1988.

History

2009 Claxton Shield squad
South Australia's 19-man roster for the 2009 Claxton Shield, Announced by Baseball South Australia.

Famous players
 Vic Richardson
 Ian Chappell
 Mark Hutton
 Shayne Bennett
 Luke Prokopec
 Andrew Scott

References

Claxton Shield
Baseball teams in Australia
Bas
Baseball teams established in 1934
1934 establishments in Australia